Alexander Oppler (10 February 1869 – 18 March 1937) was a German sculptor of Jewish ancestry; best known for his portrait busts. He also worked as a medallist.

Life and work
His father was the architect, Edwin Oppler. His older brother, Ernst, was a painter and etcher.

From 1888 he studied art; first at the Academy of Fine Arts, Munich, then at the Académie Royale des Beaux-Arts in Brussels and the Académie des Beaux-Arts in Paris. He was a member of the Munich and Berlin Secessions.

He was an early member of the Deutscher Künstlerbund (Artists' Association), and took part in their first exhibition, in 1904, at what is now the Staatliche Antikensammlungen (antiquities collection) in Munich; represented by two marble statues and a plaster bust.

Among his best known works is a bust of the artist, André Derain. A sculpture he created for his family grave at the  has also been lost. Many of his works were saved by his daughter Ellen, when she emigrated to the United States. They were later donated to the Brevard Art Center (now the Foosaner Art Museum) in Melbourne, Florida.

His works may also be seen at the Wallraf-Richartz-Museum in Cologne, the Museum Kunst Palast in Düsseldorf, the Museum August Kestner in Hanover, and the Landesmuseum Württemberg in Stuttgart.

References

Further reading
 "Oppler, Alexander". In: Hans Vollmer (Ed.): Allgemeines Lexikon der Bildenden Künstler von der Antike bis zur Gegenwart, Vol.26: Olivier–Pieris. E. A. Seemann, Leipzig 1932, pg.33
 Salomon Wininger: Große jüdische National-Biographie, Vol.4. Orient Verlag, 1927, pg.585

External links

 More works by Oppler @ the Victoria & Albert Museum
 Drawings by Oppler @ the Jewish Museum Berlin

1869 births
1937 deaths
20th-century German sculptors
20th-century German male artists
German male sculptors
Olympic competitors in art competitions
People from Hanover